Southall was a constituency from 1945 to 1983. It returned one member (MP) to the House of Commons of the UK Parliament. The Labour Party candidate won the seat at each general election and no by-elections took place.

It lay in local terms administratively in Middlesex, but from 1965, in the London Borough of Ealing.

After five years it shed roughly its western half to form a new seat, Hayes and Harlington. To compensate it took in Hanwell, and later further eastern additions – parts of Ealing.

Summary of results
Its voters, on the national first-past-the-post system, elected a series of three Labour Party candidates during its thirty-eight-year currency. Winning majorities ranged from 41.2% in 1945 - the landslide election for the party in which the seat included industrial Hayes to the west to 5.1% at the 1964 election which saw the start of the First Wilson Ministry when its second incumbent, Pargiter, who retired two years later, was aged 67.  Its final winning majority (in 1979) was 21.5%.

Boundaries
1945–1950:The borough of Southall and Hayes and Harlington Urban District
1950–1974:The borough of Southall and the Hanwell North and Hanwell South wards of the Borough of Ealing.
1974–1983: The London Borough of Ealing wards of Dormers Wells, Elthorne, Glebe, Northcote, Northfields, Walpole, and Waxlow Manor.

In the first five years the seat was largest (containing Hayes, Yeading, Harlington in the west) The ward name Elthorne refers to the very large medieval hundred and, with minor parts of other wards in the same seat, took in Hanwell.

Local government body change
The seat was in local terms for 20 years in Middlesex and for the following 18 years in London — a change in county took place in 1965.

Constituency profile

The Quaker Oats Company built a factory in Southall in 1936. Part of the operation that made pet foods was sold to Spiller's in 1994, and the remainder to Big Bear Group in 2006. The site continues to produce brands such as Sugar Puffs. Other engineering, paint and food processing factories prospered for many years, mostly alongside the railway and/or canal.
A collection of Martinware – Salt glazed pottery in stoneware, and birds – is on display at Southall Library

Southall was the home of Southall Studios, one of the earliest British film studios. It played a historic role in film-making from its creation in 1924 to its closure in 1959. There has been a locomotive works at the Southall Depot for nearly 150 years. Originally a Great Western Railway shed, it was possibly the last London steam depot, outlasting Old Oak Common and Stewarts Lane depots. The depot was later used for DMU maintenance and as a base for the electrification programme. Currently the site, now referred to as the Southall Railway Centre, is used by three independent groups, including Locomotive Services (where volunteers can contribute to the preservation and restoration of mainline locomotives).

The bus and commercial vehicle manufacturer Associated Equipment Company (AEC) was based in Southall, on a  triangular site between Windmill Lane, the main Great Western Railway and the branch to Brentford Dock. The company moved there from Walthamstow in 1926 and closed in 1979 after losing market share whilst part of the giant but inefficient British Leyland group. The site was noticeable to railway passengers and to motorists on Uxbridge Road due to large signs proclaiming "AEC - Builders of London's Buses for 50 years".

A major gas works manufacturing town gas was between the railway and the canal. In 1932 a large gasholder was built which has been a landmark from far away. Painted on the north east side of the gasholder are large letters 'LH' and an arrow to assist pilots toward Heathrow Airport's (closed) runway "23" when making visual approaches. The letters were painted in the mid-1960s after a fraction of pilots at a glance mistook RAF Northolt (which has a smaller gasholder under its approach at Harrow). Northolt has a much shorter runway and is not suitable for very large aircraft; one Boeing 707 did land at Northolt by mistake  and a number of other aircraft had to be warned off by air traffic control at the last minute. Since such gas production ceased in the 1970s upon tapping natural gas piped from the North Sea, much of the  site has been vacant, due to limited road access and remaining gas infrastructure.

The 1970s saw racial tensions in the area; in 1976 Sikh teenager Gurdip Singh Chaggar was killed in a racist attack. On 23 April 1979, Blair Peach, a teacher and anti-racist activist, was killed after being knocked unconscious during a protest against the National Front (NF). Another demonstrator, Clarence Baker – a singer of the reggae band Misty in Roots, remained in a coma for five months. More than 40 others—including 21 police—were injured, and 300 were arrested.

Members of Parliament

Elections in the 1940s

Elections in the 1950s

*Note: major loss of territory to west to new seat, Hayes and Harlington

Elections in the 1960s

Elections in the 1970s

References

Specific

Parliamentary constituencies in London (historic)
Constituencies of the Parliament of the United Kingdom established in 1945
Constituencies of the Parliament of the United Kingdom disestablished in 1983
Southall